The 2018 European Junior Swimming Championships were held from 4 to 8 July 2018 in Helsinki, Finland. The Championships were organized by LEN, the European Swimming League, and were held in a 50-meter pool. The Championships were for girls aged 14–17 and boys age 15–18.

Results

Boys

Girls

Mixed events

Medal table

References

External links 
Results
Results book

European Junior Swimming Championships
European Junior Swimming Championships
International sports competitions hosted by Finland
European Junior Swimming Championships
Swimming competitions in Finland
International sports competitions in Helsinki
Junior Swimming Championships
2010s in Helsinki
Swimming